Asramam Children's Park (also known as Children's Park, Kollam) is a park for children, situated at Asramam in Kollam city, Kerala. The park is owned by Kollam Municipal Corporation, India. It is also called Children’s Traffic Park. This park is considered as a part of Asramam Picnic Village, main centre for recreational activities in Kollam city. A model Adventure Park and a 200-year-old British Residency (which is considered as a Government Guest House) are situated very close to this park.

Location
 Kollam KSRTC Bus Station – 1.2 km
 Kollam Junction railway station – 3.8 km
 Chinnakada – 1.2 km
 Kollam Port – 3.4 km
 Kollam Ferry Terminal – 1.2 km
 Andamukkam City Bus Stand – 2.6 km

Facilities and attractions
The Children's Park in Asramam is one of the major attractions of Kollam city. The Government of Kerala modernized the park with Central Government aid in 2009–2010. It got another facelift in 2014, with the addition of a swimming pool and new rides.

 Gateway
 Compound wall
 Mandapams
 Restroom complex
 Open-air auditorium
 Toilet block
 Swimming pool
 Restaurant
 Shopping stalls
 250kv Transformer
 Multi-purpose Gymnasium
 Video Games

Rides

 Air Balloon ride
 Battery cars
 Break Dance ride
 Dashing/Bombing Cars
 Cycles
 Duck boat
 Flying singer rider
 Giraffe Train ride
 Sun-Moon wheel

Nowadays, this children's park is a regular exhibition ground for the Kollam Flower Show.

References

Tourist attractions in Kollam
Parks in Kollam